Lisa Ann Sandell is an American author of young adult novels. She has written and published three books, A Map of the Known World, Song of the Sparrow and The Weight of the Sky.

Biography

Before she published her first book, Sandell interned in Jerusalem, Israel at the news magazine The Jerusalem Report. The experience informed Sandell's first novel, The Weight of the Sky, published by Viking Children's Books in 2006.

In 1999, Sandell received a BA in Medieval and Renaissance Literature from the University of Pennsylvania. Her honors thesis on Sir Thomas Malory's treatment of Lancelot in Le Morte d'Arthur provided the inspiration for her second novel, Song of the Sparrow.

Sandell moved to New York City in 2000, and began work as a children's book editor. She continues to write for young adults, and wrote a short story titled "See Me"  for the anthology 21 Proms, which was published by Point in 2007.

Young adult novels
The Weight of the Sky (2006)
Song of the Sparrow (2007)
A Map of the Known World (2009)

Short stories
"See Me", included in the young adult anthology 21 Proms, which was published in 2007.

Awards
''New York Public Library Book for the Teen Age", 2007, for "The Weight of the Sky"
"Voice of Youth Advocates Best Science Fiction, Fantasy, and Horror titles, 2007, for "Song of the Sparrow"

References

External links

. The author's page at her publisher, Scholastic Corporation.
. An interview with the author at ChasingRay.com

21st-century American novelists
American women novelists
Writers from Delaware
American writers of young adult literature
Living people
21st-century American women writers
Women writers of young adult literature
Year of birth missing (living people)